Seair may refer to:

Seair Seaplanes, an airline based in Richmond, British Columbia, Canada
South East Asian Airlines, also called SEAir Inc
World Seair Corp Seair, ultralight flying boat